This is a list of the England women's national football team results from 1980 to 1989.

Results

1980

1981

1982

1983

1984

1985

1986

1987

1988

1989

References

1980s in England
1980s